Events in the year 1854 in Iceland.

Incumbents 

 Monarch: Frederick VII of Denmark
 Prime Minister of Denmark: Anders Sandøe Ørsted (until 12 December); Peter Georg Bang onwards

Events 

 The Danish government relaxed the trade ban that had been imposed in 1602, and Iceland gradually began to rejoin Western Europe economically and socially.

Births 

 4 June − Pétur J. Thorsteinsson, merchant.

References 

 
1850s in Iceland
Years of the 19th century in Iceland
Iceland
Iceland